The Paschal mystery is one of the central concepts of Catholic faith relating to the history of salvation. According to the Compendium of the Catechism of the Catholic Church, "The Paschal Mystery of Jesus, which comprises his passion, death, resurrection, and glorification, stands at the center of the Christian faith because God's saving plan was accomplished once for all by the redemptive death of himself as Jesus Christ." The Catechism states that in the liturgy of the Church "it is principally his own Paschal mystery that Christ signifies and makes present."

Catholic, Anglican and Orthodox Christian churches celebrate this mystery on Easter. It is recalled and celebrated also during every Eucharist, and especially on a Sunday, which is the Pascha of the week.

Background 

According to the Book of Exodus, God (Yahweh) commanded Moses to tell the Israelites to mark a lamb's blood above their doors in order that the Angel of Death would pass over them. Paschal refers to the passage of God's destroying angel on the night of Passover. The angel "passed over" the houses of the Israelites but killed the firstborn child in the houses of the Egyptians.

A sacred mystery is a divine mystery which cannot be grasped by mere human reasoning and can only be revealed by God through grace.

Patristic spiritual and theological aspects 
The very first known use of the term Paschal mystery (literally  Mystery of the Pascha) was found in the homily of Melito of Sardis On the Pascha written between A.D. 160 and 170:

According to Raniero Cantalamessa OFMCap, patristic interpretation of the paschal mystery in its major facets and constituent dimensions may be summarized in four points:
 History. Historical events form the foundation for the Paschal mystery and are commemorated in the paschal liturgy of Easter
 Sacraments and mystagogy. Historical events of the death and resurrection of Christ are realized in the believer as passage from death to life. Primarily, it is achieved in baptism and the Eucharist, but the paschal solemnity of Easter taken as a whole is itself a sacrament, the paschal sacramentum.
 Moral and spiritual life. Pascha (or Easter) is a transitus – detachment from evil, conversion to good, and progress in spiritual life, until the final transitus to the Kingdom of God.
 Eschatology. In the early years of the Church Paschal mystery was celebrated with a vivid expectation of the coming of Christ. Gradually Christian communities have come to focus on the presence of Christ in the Church as liturgical  anticipation of the parousia. Paschal eschatology has also individual dimension as eagerness for the heavenly Pascha. Paschal mystery becomes a pledge of eternal life.

Catholic teaching 
To underscore the importance of the Paschal mystery, the Compendium of the Catechism of the Catholic Church, states that "The Paschal Mystery of Jesus, which comprises his passion, death, resurrection, and glorification, stands at the center of the Christian faith because God's saving plan was accomplished once for all by the redemptive death of his Son Jesus Christ."

The Second Vatican Council 
According to Pope Benedict XVI, the most important and essential message of the council is "the Paschal Mystery as the center of what it is to be Christian and therefore of the Christian life, the Christian year, the Christian seasons". The term Mysterium paschale was used repeatedly during Second Vatican Council (1963–65) as a meaningful designation of the Christian redemption proclaimed and now accomplished in the liturgy. Council Fathers endorsed the fruit of the work of scholars of the Liturgical Movement, specifically Dom Odo Casel and the whole Maria Laach Abbey. The term mystery of salvation made its way to the Council documents not without some opposition or misunderstanding. Some fathers expressed doubts saying that it was a vague and chimeric idea, its orthodoxy was dubious, and that it was ignored by sound theology. Eventually the Council decided to confirm the importance of the term. It is reflected especially in the Constitution on the liturgy Sacrosanctum Concilium. In the very beginning of 1st chapter, where the Council document speaks about restoration and promotion of the liturgy, paschal mystery is shown as the way Christ has redeemed mankind:

Post-Conciliar magisterial documents 

After Second Vatican Council the term Paschal mystery has been used by Catholic Church Magisterium as one of basic concepts of Christian faith and life.

The Catechism of the Catholic Church states that "The Paschal mystery of Christ's cross and Resurrection stands at the center of the Good News that the apostles, and the Church following them, are to proclaim to the world. God's saving plan was accomplished 'once for all' by the redemptive death of his Son Jesus Christ." (CCC 571)

In explaining the sacramental system of the church or the sacramental economy, the Catechism dedicates one chapter on the Paschal mystery in the Age of the Church. It teaches that "In the liturgy of the Church, it is principally his own Paschal mystery that Christ signifies and makes present. During his earthly life Jesus announced his Paschal mystery by his teaching and anticipated it by his actions. When his Hour comes, he lives out the unique event of history which does not pass away: Jesus dies, is buried, rises from the dead, and is seated at the right hand of the Father 'once for all.'

"His Paschal mystery is a real event that occurred in our history, but it is unique: all other historical events happen once, and then they pass away, swallowed up in the past. The Paschal mystery of Christ, by contrast, cannot remain only in the past, because by his death he destroyed death, and all that Christ is - all that he did and suffered for all men - participates in the divine eternity, and so transcends all times while being made present in them all. The event of the Cross and Resurrection abides and draws everything toward life." (CCC 1085)

It also explains that "The Paschal mystery has two aspects: by his death, Christ liberates us from sin; by his Resurrection, he opens for us the way to a new life. This new life is above all justification that reinstates us in God's grace, 'so that as Christ was raised from the dead by the glory of the Father, we too might walk in newness of life.'Justification consists in both victory over the death caused by sin and a new participation in grace. It brings about filial adoption so that men become Christ's brethren." (CCC 654)

In 1992 letter Communionis notio of the Congregation for the Doctrine of the Faith to the bishops about the Church understood as communion, paschal mystery is explained as the means by which God's initiative was carried out to bring to disciples of Christ and, indeed, to the whole of mankind the gift of communion.

John Paul II in his letter on keeping the Lord's day holy wrote that to celebrate Sunday is to make present the graces of the Paschal mystery, which is the climax of the salvation history:

The document called Instrumentum Laboris, issued before the Synod on the Eucharist (2005), spoke about perception of the Eucharistic mystery among the faithful. In many developed countries Christians fail to see the Eucharist as a celebration of the paschal mystery. They tend to perceive it as simply the fulfilment of a Sunday obligation and a meal of fellowship. The paschal mystery, celebrated in an unbloody manner on the altar, is much more a source of spiritual strength to those Christians who live in the situation of suffering, wars, and natural disasters etc.

During the 2005 Synod, Pope Benedict XVI and bishops emphasised the need for the faithful to enter more deeply into the mystery being celebrated. They called for a process of mystagogy, i.e. initiation into the mystery of Salvation. According to the Pope's exhortation published after the Synod, initiation into the mystery of the liturgy should respect three elements:
 Interpretation of the events of Jesus' life, and the Paschal mystery in particular, in relation to the entire history of the Old Testament.
 Introduction into the meaning of the signs and gestures of the rites. In a highly technological age people no longer understand them.
 Safeguarding the impact celebration of the rites should have on Christian life in all its dimensions – work and responsibility, thoughts and emotions, activity and repose.

Pope called for new communities and movements to assist in the practical realisation of that programme in parishes:

Among the new communities of consecrated life which contribute to the Christian formation there are e.g. Community of St. John, Community of the Lamb, Monastic Fraternities of Jerusalem and others. The Pope spoke also about new movements and groups working in the field of Christian formation. Among internationally active there are e.g. Charismatic Renewal, Communion and Liberation, Community of the Beatitudes, Community of the Chemin Neuf, Community of Sant'Egidio, Emmanuel Community,  Focolare Movement, Neocatechumenal Way, Opus Dei, etc. These communities, movements and groups have emerged in the 20th century on the grounds of Second Vatican Council's renewal of the Church.

Paschal mystery and the traditionalists
The concept of the paschal mystery is criticised by the traditionalists. According to the address of the Superior of the Society of St. Pius X, Bishop Bernard Fellay (2001), the theology of the "paschal mystery" minimizes the mystery of the Redemption, because it considers the sacrament only in its relation with the "mystery", and because the conception that it makes of the "memorial"  alters the sacrificial dimension of the Mass and as a consequence it renders the post-Conciliar Liturgy dangerously distant from Catholic doctrine. Card. Joseph Ratzinger and Jonathan Robinson CO assert that the traditionalists put themselves in a false position, overlooking the fact that the Vatican II's teaching about this issue restored a profoundly traditional doctrine, central to Christian thought and experience.

Protestant view 
Protestant view of grace and salvation was influenced very much by nominalism of William Ockham's razor. In Martin Luther's opinion Ockham was the only scholastic whose teaching was worth studying. Rejection of traditional Metaphysics, and especially the universals, paved the way to modern empiricism. In this nominalistic Protestant view of relationship between God and creation, the mystery of God becomes utterly unattainable for human reason, even if it is illumined by faith. While traditional understanding of the mystery of faith is that the Divine revelation can use human word, somehow assimilating the Word of God, to initiate man into the mystery of the divine life, according to Louis Bouyer, the Protestant view excludes such approach. Revelation of the mystery of salvation to man is compatible with traditional philosophy, like Thomism, and incompatible with the Protestant view of grace, influenced by nominalism.

Theological reflection 

Paschal mystery embraces several events of Jesus' passing away from this world. They are central to the Christian Creed.

The Crucifixion and Descent of Jesus to the Dead 
Jesus sacrificed his life by freely accepting death on the cross and being put in a tomb. In experiencing death and overcoming it in resurrection, Christ assures us that we will have life everlasting with God as we too, through Christ's accomplishment as our representative, will triumph over death and pass into eternal life with the resurrection of the glorified body.

The Resurrection 
Three days after he died and was buried, Christian faith holds that Jesus was raised from the dead with a new and glorified body. All four Gospels of the New Testament clearly give an account of the resurrection. This event is at the heart of faith in Christ (see 1 Corinthians 15:3-5).

The Ascension and Exaltation 
Forty days after the resurrection, the risen Christ ascended to the Father in Heaven, God's domain. From there, Christ, who is hidden from our eyes, will come again in glory at the end of time to judge the living and the dead. Through the Ascension and Exaltation of Christ, humanity has been given the unbreakable promise of everlasting life with God. 
 
Through the Paschal Mystery everything has been justified and made right in Christ with God. Jesus came to fulfil and perfect the covenant of God, and to assure all that God's love is eternal and constant.

"As Jesus truly dies and is buried, how we should be filled with wonder! Seamlessly the sadness of Christ’s death gives way to the joy of the Resurrection as Easter dawns upon us" (Compendium, 126).

The uniqueness of the Paschal mystery 
The paschal mystery is a singular event that can never be repeated, undone, changed, corrected, substituted, equated, or superseded. It is present at all times and in all places, while transcending space-time. Its effects, such as granting sinners repentance, are universal and timeless. It has definitively accomplished all of the following: redeemed all of creation, defeated every evil, brought forth the church and everything pertaining to it, inaugurated the messianic age, ended Satan's dominion over mankind by inaugurating the kingdom of God, fulfilled the Old Testament, and made Jesus' humanity participate in the mode, omnipotence, and authority of the second person of the Trinity.

References

Bibliography 

 Balthasar, Hans Urs, (1993) Mysterium Paschale : the mystery of Easter, Aidan Nichols OP (translation and introduction), Grand Rapids, Michigan, USA : W.B. Eerdmans, pp. 297 
 Bonnard, Pierre Émile OP, (1988) Passover, in: Dictionary of Biblical Theology, Xavier Léon-Dufour (ed.), Third rev. edition, Pasay, Philippines - London: Paulines - Geoffrey Chapman, p. 406-409.
 Bouyer, Louis, (1951) The Paschal Mystery. Meditations on the Last Three Days of Holy Week, London.
 Bouyer L.,(1956) The spirit and forms of protestantism, A. V. Littledale (trnasl.), London - Glasgow: Collins, p. 285.
 Bouyer L. (1965), The Liturgy Revived. A Doctrinal Commentary of the Conciliar Constitution on the Liturgy. London: A Libra Book, 1965, pp. 107.
 Cantalamessa, Raniero OFMCap, (1993) Introduction in Easter in the Early Church. An Anthology of Jewish and Early Christian Texts, Quigley SJ, J.T. Lienhard SJ (translators & editors), Collegville, Minnesota: The Liturgical Press, pp. 1–23, 
 Füglister, Notker, (1969) Passover, in: Sacramentum Mundi, vol. 4, New York - London: Herder and Herder - Burns & Oates, p. 352-357, 
 Gilson, Étienne, (1955, this edition 1985), History of Christian Philosophy in the Middle Ages, London: Sheed and Ward, pp. 829, 
 John Paul II, (1998) Apostolic letter On Keeping the Lord's Day Holy "Dies Domini"; see the text on-line: APOSTOLIC LETTER DIES DOMINI. Access date:2012-03-12.
 The Paschal mystery : ancient liturgies and patristic texts,(1969) A. Hamman (editor), Staten Island, NY : Alba House, pp. 230
 Rahner K., Mystery, in: Sacramentum Mundi, vol. 4, New York - London: Herder and Herder - Burns & Oates, p. 133-136,

External links 
 Loyolapress.com/our catholic - The Paschal Mystery in Every Day Life

Resurrection of Jesus
Christian terminology